A board of estimate is a governing body, particularly in the United States.

Typically, the board's membership will consist of a combination of elected officials from the executive branch (e.g., the mayor or county executive) and the legislative branch (called the city council or, in some localities, the board of supervisors), and its powers are usually concentrated in such areas as taxation and debt management.

In Minneapolis, the Minneapolis Board of Estimate and Taxation is a "council of government" form of government, where elected officials from other Boards sit to make policy that affects all the Boards. In this case, the Minneapolis Board of Estimate has the Mayor, the City Council, independent Park Board Members, and independently elected persons on the Board of Estimate and Taxation. It primarily makes tax and debt policy for both the City and the Park Board organizations.

Baltimore has a Board of Estimates. The Baltimore City Board of Estimates consists of five voting members: The Mayor, the President of the City Council, the Comptroller, the City Solicitor, and the Director of Public Works. The President of the City Council serves as President of the Board of Estimates, and the City Comptroller serves as Secretary to the Board.  Similar to Minneapolis, it sets fiscal policy for the City by sharing power among different elected individuals.

Middleton, New York has a Board of Estimate which is made up of the Mayor, the President of the Common Council and the Chair of the Finance Committee.  They oversee the finances of the City, including purchasing, contracts, debt management, setting salaries and other similar financial duties. 

Mount Vernon, New York has a Board of Estimate and Contracts, made up of the Mayor, Comptroller and City Council President, which oversees the City's finances. 

New York City had a Board of Estimate but it was found to be unconstitutional in 1989 because each borough had one vote, making Brooklyn's vote equal to that of Staten Island, which was found to violate the 14th Amendment.

See also
New York City Board of Estimate (defunct)

References

 https://www.minneapolismn.gov/government/boards-and-commissions/bet/
 https://comptroller.baltimorecity.gov/boe
 https://www.middletown-ny.com/en/boards/board-of-estimate.html

Government institutions